The 2019–20 Harvard Crimson Men's ice hockey season was the 120th season of play for the program and the 59th season in the ECAC Hockey conference. The Crimson represented Harvard University and were coached by Ted Donato, in his 16th season as their head coach.

on March 11, Harvard announced that it would not allow its team to travel to Rensselaer and withdrew from the tournament due to coronavirus fears. A day later ECAC Hockey announced that the remainder of the tournament was cancelled due to the COVID-19 pandemic.

Season
The team forfeited their ECAC quarterfinal series to the RPI Engineers and ended their season, due to the Ivy League's decision to suspend its athletics in response to the coronavirus pandemic.

Departures

Recruiting

Roster

As of November 26, 2019.

Standings

Schedule and results

|-
!colspan=12 style=";" | Exhibition

|-
!colspan=12 style=";" | Regular Season

|-
!colspan=12 style=";" | 

|-
!colspan=12 style=";" | 

|- align="center" bgcolor="#e0e0e0"
|colspan=12|Harvard Won Series 2–0
|- align="center" bgcolor="#e0e0e0"
|colspan=12|Remainder of Tournament Cancelled

Scoring statistics

Goaltending statistics

Rankings

Players drafted into the NHL

2020 NHL Entry Draft

† incoming freshman

References

2019–20
Harvard Crimson
Harvard Crimson
2019 in sports in Massachusetts
2020 in sports in Massachusetts
2019 in Boston
2020 in Boston